The 1999 Proximus 24 Spa World Championship GT was the 53rd running of the Spa 24 Hours. It took place at the Circuit de Spa-Francorchamps, Belgium, between 3 and 4 August 1999. The event was won by the #1 Peugeot Team Belgique Luxembourg Peugeot 306 GTi.

2 classes ran in the event. Group 1 - Superproduction fuel (SP) and Group 2 - Group N 2000 (N2.0). 53 cars started with 27 being classified.

Race results
Class winners in bold.

References

Spa 24 Hours
Spa 24 Hours